Clay V. Spear (c. 1914 – May 15, 1974) was a justice of the Idaho Supreme Court from 1965 to 1971.

Early life, education, and military service
Born in Anaconda, Montana, Spear graduated from the University of Idaho, and received his J.D. from the University of Idaho College of Law in 1936. He served in the European theatre of World War II, where he "received four battle stars and a Bronze Star medal for service in the Battle of the Bulge". In 1946, he was named head of the VFW of Coeur D'Alene.

Judicial career
Spear was appointed as a district judge in 1953, and elevated to the Idaho Supreme Court by Governor Robert E. Smylie in 1965, taking office on January 2, 1966. A resident of Coeur D'Alene, Idaho, at the time, he was the only member of the court from northern Idaho. Spear retired from the court in December 1971, due to poor health.

Death
Spear "was found dead of a shotgun wound at his home", in an apparent suicide at the age of 60.

References

People from Anaconda, Montana
University of Idaho alumni
University of Idaho College of Law alumni
United States Army personnel of World War II
Justices of the Idaho Supreme Court
Suicides by firearm in Idaho

1910s births
1974 deaths

Year of birth uncertain